Mwezé Ngangura (born 7 October 1950) is a film director from the Democratic Republic of the Congo (DRC).

Early years

Mwezé Ngangura was born in Bukavu, DRC on 7 October 1950.
At the age of twenty he won a scholarship to go to Belgium and study at the Institut des arts de diffusion, graduating in 1975.
While a student he made two short films, Tamtam-Electronique and Rhythm and blood.
Returning to Zaire in 1976 he became a lecturer at three colleges in Kinshasa: the National Institute of Arts (INA), Institute of Science and Information Technologies (ISTI) and Studio-School of the Voice of Zaire (SEVOZA).

For ten years Mwezé Ngangura made TV documentaries in Zaire.
He made his first documentary, Cheri Samba, in 1980.  This is a portrait of a popular young painter from Kinshasa. 
His next work Kin Kiesse documents the sweet and sour pleasures of Kinshasa la Belle.
"Kin-Kiesse" won prizes in Ouagadougou (FESPACO '83), Hammamet (CIRTEF '83), and was selected for INPUT '86 in Montreal.

Later career

In 1985, returning to Europe, Mwezé Ngangura worked on the scenario of La Vie est Belle  (Life is Wonderful) with funding from the  French Ministry of Foreign Affairs.
Ngangura founded Sol'Oeil Films in Kinshasa and Film Sud in Brussels, and has been producing his own films with these companies to preserve his independence.
Sol'Oeil Films co-produced La Vie est Belle, a feature film that he made with Benoit Lamy and which had great success in Francophone countries in Africa.
La Vie est Belle starring Papa Wemba tells the story of a poor young country musician who comes to the city and becomes famous.

In 1992, Mwezé Ngangura made Changa-Changa, Rythmes en noirs et blancs (Changa-Changa, Rhythms in Black and White), a documentary produced in Brussels on intercultural encounters where different styles of music enrich.  "Changa-Changa" was broadcast on television and shown at many festivals, including FESPACO (Pan African Film Festival of Ouagadougou), Vues d'Afrique (Montreal), and Bilan du Film Ethnographique (Paris).
In 1994, he made Le Roi, la vache et le bananier (The King, the Cow and the Banana), a 60-minute documentary that won several awards.
The next year he directed Lettre à Makura : les derniers Bruxellois, a view by an African ethnologist of the marolliens, the oldest community in Brussels.
In 1997, he directed Le général Tombeur, a 26-minute documentary that tells the story of Bukavu from the expedition of General Charles-Henri Tombeur in 1914-18 to the current date. This film was selected at the Festival of Ouagadougou (FESPACO) in February 1997 and the Montreal festival Views from Africa in April 1997.

In 1998 Mwezé Ngangura directed  Pièces d'Identités (Identity Pieces), a feature film shot in Brussels (mainly in the district of Matonge - Ixelles ) and Cameroon, which received the Audience Award at the 8th Festival of African Cinema of Milan in 1998 and the Grand Prix at FESPACO in Ouagadougou in 1999.
Pièces d'Identités is a modern fairy story set in the world of African immigrants in Europe.
His 2005 film Les Habits Neuf du Gouverneur again starred Papa Wemba. 
The production schedule was disrupted when Wemba was sent to jail in Belgium to await trial on charges of human trafficking.

Filmography

References

Democratic Republic of the Congo film directors
People from Bukavu
1950 births
Living people